The 2012 Philippine Basketball Association (PBA) Governors' Cup, was the third and last conference of the 2011–12 PBA season. The tournament started on May 20 and culminated on August 5 with the Rain or Shine Elasto Painters team defeating the B-Meg Llamados team by 4 games to 3.

The tournament was an import-laden format, which allowed an import or a pure-foreign player for each team and with a height limit of 6-foot-5.

Format
The following format was observed for the duration of the conference:
 Single-round robin eliminations; 9 games per team; Teams are then seeded by basis on win–loss records. 
 The top six teams after the eliminations will advance to the semifinals. In case of a tie, a playoff will be held only for the #6 seed.
 Semifinals will be a single round-robin affair with the remaining six teams. Results from the eliminations will be carried over. A playoff incentive for a finals berth will be given to the team that will win at least four of their five semifinal games that does not finish within the top two. In case of a tie, a playoff will be held only for the #2 seed.
 The top two teams (or the #1 team and the winner of the playoff between team with at least 4 semifinal wins and the #2 team) will face each other in a best-of-seven championship series.

Elimination round

Team standings

Schedule

Results

Sixth seed playoffs

Semifinal round

Team standings

Schedule

Results

Finals berth playoff

Finals

Imports 
The following is the list of imports, which had played for their respective teams at least once, with the returning imports in italics. Highlighted are the imports who stayed with their respective teams for the entire conference.

Awards

Conference
Best Player of the Conference: Mark Caguioa (Barangay Ginebra Kings)
Best Import of the Conference: Jamelle Cornley (Rain or Shine Elasto Painters)
Finals MVP: Jeffrei Chan (Rain or Shine Elasto Painters)

Players of the Week

References

External links
 PBA.ph

PBA Governors' Cup
Governors' Cup